Joshua Marc Davies (born 12 September 1985) is an Australian professional baseball player.

Career
Davies attended Bendigo Senior Secondary College. He signed with the Anaheim Angels as an international free agent in 2003. The Angels released Davies in 2007, and he signed with the San Diego Padres organisation a week later. He competed for the Australian national baseball team in the 2013 World Baseball Classic.

References

External links

1985 births
Living people
Arizona League Angels players
Arizona League Padres players
Australian expatriate baseball players in the United States
Baseball infielders
Cedar Rapids Kernels players
Melbourne Aces players
Sportspeople from Bendigo
Rancho Cucamonga Quakes players
2013 World Baseball Classic players